The 2015–16 Toronto Maple Leafs season was the 99th season for the National Hockey League franchise that was established on November 22, 1917. The season officially began its regular games on October 7, 2015, with a 3–1 loss against the Montreal Canadiens.

Despite stretches of strong play, with the Maple Leafs at one point being within a few points of a playoff spot, they broke the franchise record for most losses in a season with 53 (the previous record was 52 in 1984–85). However, it is important to note the previous record was set when there were only 80 games per season (two have since been added, bringing the total games played yearly to 82 per team). Due to the point awarded for overtime and shootout losses, the Leafs finished the season with 69 points, one more than the previous season. Despite the improved record, the Maple Leafs finished last overall in the NHL standings for the first time since the 1984-85 season. On April 30, 2016, it was announced that the Leafs had won the draft lottery, and would receive the first overall pick in the 2016 NHL Entry Draft. Auston Matthews was subsequently selected first overall.

On July 1, 2015, the Maple Leafs were part of a blockbuster, multi-player deal that centred on Phil Kessel moving to the Pittsburgh Penguins, with one of the key pieces for Toronto being prospect Kasperi Kapanen. Kessel would be a central piece in the Penguins' Stanley Cup win later that season. Months later, another significant trade occurred when captain Dion Phaneuf plus four other players were traded to Ottawa Senators in exchange for four players plus a second round draft pick in 2017. A trade like this was seen as substantial due to the divisional Battle of Ontario rivalry and the NHL salary cap, which typically prevents more than a few players from moving at once.

Off-season
The Maple Leafs made numerous personnel changes prior to the start of the season. Mike Babcock and Lou Lamoriello were hired as head coach and general manager, respectively, replacing Dave Nonis and interim head coach Peter Horachek. Additionally, in an effort to bring in new personnel, coaches Steve Spott, Chris Dennis, Rick St. Croix; Director of Player Development Jim Hughes; and Director of Pro Scouting Steve Kasper, as well as Rob Cowie, strength and conditioning coach Anthony Belza, and 18 other scouts were fired. The team would find replacements for these members throughout the off season.

The 2015 NHL Entry Draft was held between July 26 and 27, and the Maple Leafs made a total of 9 selections, while also acquiring defenceman Martin Marincin.

Following the draft, the Leafs made a number of moves during the free agency period, signing players such as P. A. Parenteau, Mark Arcobello, and Shawn Matthias to short term contracts. The most noteworthy move came in a blockbuster deal that sent winger Phil Kessel to the Pittsburgh Penguins, along with Tim Erixon, Tyler Biggs and a conditional second-round draft pick, in exchange for Kasperi Kapanen, Nick Spaling, Scott Harrington, and a conditional set of draft picks.

As the off-season went on, the team would sign Devin Setoguchi, Curtis Glencross, Brad Boyes, and Mark Fraser to professional try out contracts. Out of these four, Boyes was the only one to sign a contract, inking a one-year deal, while the others were released.

For a complete list of on-ice off-season moves, please see Transactions.

Standings

Record vs opponents

* game decided in overtime or shoot-out

Schedule and results

Pre-season

Regular season

Overtime statistics

Player statistics
Final stats

Skaters

Goaltenders

†Denotes player spent time with another team before joining the Maple Leafs. Stats reflect time with the Maple Leafs only.
‡Denotes player was traded mid-season. Stats reflect time with the Maple Leafs only.
Bold/italics denotes franchise record.

Player suspensions/fines

Awards and honours

Awards

Milestones
A variety of milestones were set by players during the season. In terms of debuts, twelve players appeared in this first NHL game this season. They include Byron Froese, Garret Sparks, Brendan Leipsic, Viktor Loov, Zach Hyman, Kasperi Kapanen, William Nylander, Nikita Soshnikov, Rinat Valiev, Connor Brown, Frederik Gauthier and Tobias Lindberg.

Transactions
The Maple Leafs have been involved in the following transactions during the 2015–16 season.

Trades

Free agents acquired
Players signed to professional try out contracts are not included in this table. Please see off-season for try outs.

Free agents lost

Claimed via waivers

Lost via waivers

Lost via retirement

Player signings

Draft picks

Below are the Toronto Maple Leafs' selections at the 2015 NHL Entry Draft, held on June 26–27, 2015 at the BB&T Center in Sunrise, Florida.

Pick Notes
 The Toronto Maple Leafs' second-round pick was re-acquired as the result of a trade on June 26, 2015 that sent Tampa Bay's first-round pick in 2015 (29th overall) to Columbus in exchange for Philadelphia's third-round pick in 2015 (68th overall) and this pick.
 Columbus previously acquired this pick as the result of a trade on March 5, 2014 that sent Marian Gaborik to Los Angeles in exchange for Matt Frattin, a conditional third-round pick in 2014 and this pick.
 Los Angeles previously acquired this pick as the result of a trade on June 23, 2013 that sent Jonathan Bernier to Toronto in exchange for Ben Scrivens, Matt Frattin and this pick (being conditional at the time of the trade). The condition – Los Angeles will receive a second-round pick in 2014 or 2015 at Toronto's choice – was converted on January 18, 2014 when Toronto's second-round pick in 2014 was traded to the Anaheim Ducks.
 The Chicago Blackhawks' second-round pick went to the Toronto Maple Leafs as the result of a trade on June 26, 2015 that Nashville's first-round pick in 2015 (24th overall) to Philadelphia in exchange for Tampa Bay's first-round pick in 2015 (29th overall) and this pick.
 Philadelphia previously acquired this pick as the result of a trade on February 27, 2015 that sent Kimmo Timonen to Chicago in exchange for a conditional fourth-round pick in 2016 and this pick.
 The Philadelphia Flyers' third-round pick went the Toronto Maple Leafs as the result of a trade on June 26, 2015 that sent Tampa Bay's first-round pick in 2015 (29th overall) to Columbus in exchange for Toronto's second-round pick in 2015 (34th overall) and this pick.
 Columbus previously acquired this pick as the result of a trade on April 3, 2013 that sent Steve Mason to Philadelphia in exchange for Michael Leighton and this pick.

Notes

References

Toronto Maple Leafs seasons
Toronto Maple Leafs season, 2015-16
Toronto